Caudinidae is a family of sea cucumbers, marine animals with elongated bodies, leathery skins and tentacles that are found on the sea floor.

Description
Members of the family Caudinidae are fairly small, plump sea cucumbers with a thin body wall and no tube feet. They are relatively inactive and live in a "U"-shaped burrow in sand or mud at the bottom of the sea. Their tentacles spread out above the sediment to catch food particles and their caudal region may be elongated and also extend to the surface. This may help with gas exchange as they have respiratory trees, a type of water lung, attached to the cloaca.

Genera
The following genera are accepted in the family Caudinidae:
Acaudina Clark, 1907
Caudina Stimpson, 1853
Ceraplectana H.L. Clark, 1908
Hedingia Deichmann, 1938
Paracaudina Heding, 1931

References

Molpadiida